North Durham-Duke Park District is a national historic district located at Durham, Durham County, North Carolina. The district encompasses 229 contributing buildings in a predominantly residential section of Durham. The dwelling are mostly one to two-story frame buildings, dating mostly from the 1890s to 1930s and include notable examples of Bungalow / American Craftsman, Late Victorian, and Queen Anne architecture. Notable buildings include the Markham Apartments (c. 1910), Perry Building (1927), and Calvary United Methodist Church.

It was listed on the National Register of Historic Places in 1985.

References

Historic districts on the National Register of Historic Places in North Carolina
Queen Anne architecture in North Carolina
Victorian architecture in North Carolina
Historic districts in Durham, North Carolina
National Register of Historic Places in Durham County, North Carolina
Neighborhoods in Durham, North Carolina